Wusab Al Ali District is a district of the Dhamar Governorate, Yemen. As of 2003, the district had a population of 164,223 inhabitants. It is one of the largest districts of Dhamar Governorate, covering an area of 592 square kilometers, and is characterized by high mountains. As of 2019, it has a population of 275,137. It is part of the historical and geographical region of Wusab.

Divisions
Wusab Al Ali contains 850 villages and is divided into 9 makhalif, which are further subdivided into 73 subdistricts. An incomplete list of them is below:
 Al-Jabjab
 Ajbar Sawafil
 Ajbar 'Awali
 Al-Shurka' (aka al-Shuraka')
 Al-Manarah
 Bilad as-Sidh (aka Bilad al-Sadah)
 'Araf
 Yaris
 Al-Qayima
 Al-Bayadi'
 Az-Zahir
 Al-Kalbiyin al-Janubi
 Al-Mahajir
 Bani an-Namar
 Bani Shunayf (aka Bani Shanif)
 Jabal Mathan (aka Jabal Matahan)
 Sinwah (aka Sanuh)
 Zafran
 Ghaythan
 Bani Muslim
 Ad-Dayadir
 As-Sulul
 Al-Marba'ah (aka al-Muraba'ah)
 Qa'idah
 Kalah wa al-Ahyam
 Bani al-Hadad
 Al-Asluh
 Al-Jarani
 Al-Rawdah
 Al-'Utb (aka al-Utab)
 Al-Kalbiyin
 Al-Hijrah (aka al-Hijarah)
 Dhalaf
 Bani Shu'ayb
 Al-Jadalah
 Ash-Sharqi
 Al-'Aynayn
 Al-Qawati
 Al-Muwassatah
 Al-Hatari
 Dhi Hamad
 Zahr (aka Zahar)
 Qashat Rima'
 Mihzar (aka Mahzir)
 Ju'r
 As-Sayf
 Al-Shiraqi
 Al-Gharbi as-Safil
 Al-Gharbi al-'Ali
 Bani Kandah (aka Banu Kanadah)
 Habr (aka Habar)
 Khadman
 Sharqi Ja'r
 Mugharram al-Wasat
 Kabud
 Al-Ajbar
 Al-Ghawl
 Zajid
 Saban wa ar-Raq'i
 Shajab
 Sharqi Kabud
 Gharbi Kabud
 Naqadh
 Al-Athluth
 Al-Aj'ud
 As-Sunnah (aka al-Sanah)
 Ash-Shawka' (aka al-Shuwaka')
 Bani al-Masnaf
 Bani Rabi'ah
 Humayr

References

Districts of Dhamar Governorate